The Calling is an American crime procedural drama television series created by David E. Kelley for Peacock. It is adapted from Dror Mishani's 2011 novel The Missing File. All 8 episodes of the first season premiered on November 10, 2022.

Premise
Detective Avraham Avraham, a New York police detective and religious Jew, has a special knack for solving crimes.

Characters
 Jeff Wilbusch as Detective Avraham Avraham
 Juliana Canfield as Detective Janine Harris
 Karen Robinson as Captain Kathleen Davies
 Michael Mosley as Detective Earl Malzone
 Tony Curran as John Wentworth
 Noel Fisher as Zack Miller

Episodes

Production
In October 2021, it was announced that Peacock had given a straight to series order to The Missing from David E. Kelley based on Dror Mishani's novel The Missing File. The next month it was announced Jeff Wilbusch would play the lead character, Avraham Avraham.

References

External links
 

2022 American television series debuts
2020s American crime drama television series
Jews and Judaism in fiction
Television series created by David E. Kelley
Peacock (streaming service) original programming